Debnath (sometimes Nath) is an Indian surname. The 'Debnath' community mainly belongs to the Yogi-Nath group which is listed as Other Backward Class in West Bengal. Prior to independence, census statistics rarely included the caste name Debnath or Nath. 19th-century British sources mentioned that castes known as jogis or jugis existed in Bengal, Punjab and Rajputana. The Naths, however, were one of the six subgroups of Jogi in the Rajasthan Hindi census. Some sources claim that Jogis held a low position during the 19th century. They appear to be particularly linked to failed ascetics and weavers who are often of lower status. In Assam, Yogi(nath) were historically known for drumming, now agriculture is their main occupation. In the state of Himachal Pradesh they are classified as Scheduled Caste under India's Reservation system.

Notable people
 Arup Debnath (born 1987), Indian football goalkeeper
 Ishan Debnath (born 1991), Indian footballer
 Jayanta Debnath (born 1971), American pathologist
 Kingshuk Debnath (born 1985), Indian footballer
 Lokenath Debnath (born 1935), Indian-American mathematician
 Narayan Debnath (born 1950), Indian comics artist
 Pritam Debnath (born 1987), Indian cricketer
 Reema Debnath (born 1979), Indian actress
 Samapika Debnath, Indian actress and model
 Somen Debnath (born 1983), Indian activist

References

Indian surnames